Prasophyllum australe, commonly known as the southern leek orchid or austral leek orchid, is a species of orchid and is endemic to south-eastern Australia. It has a single tubular, green leaf and up to fifty scented, greenish-brown flowers with red stripes.

Description
The flowers are greenish-brown with white reddish stripes and are often sweetly fragrant. As with others in the genus, the flowers are inverted so that the labellum is above the column rather than below it. Flowering occurs from September to January and is more prolific after fire the previous summer.

Taxonomy and naming
Prasophyllum australe was first formally described in 1810 by Robert Brown and the description was published in Prodromus Florae Novae Hollandiae et Insulae Van Diemen. The specific epithet (australe) is a Latin word meaning "south".

Distribution and habitat
The southern leek orchid grows in swampy places in forest and heath in south-eastern Queensland, near-coastal New South Wales, southern Victoria, south-eastern South Australia and in Tasmania.

References

australe
Endemic orchids of Australia
Flora of Queensland
Flora of New South Wales
Flora of Victoria (Australia)
Flora of Tasmania
Flora of South Australia
Plants described in 1810